Maxwell was an American automobile manufacturer which ran from about 1904 to 1925. The present-day successor to the Maxwell company was Chrysler, now Stellantis North America, which acquired the company in 1925.

History

Maxwell-Briscoe Company
Maxwell automobile production began under the "Maxwell-Briscoe Company" of North Tarrytown, New York. The company was named after founder Jonathan Dixon Maxwell, who earlier had worked for Oldsmobile, and his business partner, Benjamin Briscoe, an automobile industry pioneer and part owner of the Briscoe Brothers Metalworks.  Briscoe was president of Maxwell-Briscoe at its height.

In 1907, following a fire that destroyed the North Tarrytown, NY, factory, Maxwell-Briscoe opened a mammoth automobile factory at 1817 I Ave, New Castle, Indiana. The newspapers reported that the factory "will operate as a whole, like an integral machine, the raw material going in at one end of the plant and the finished cars out the other end."  This factory continued as a Chrysler plant following its takeover of Maxwell until its demolition in 2004.

For a time, Maxwell was considered one of the three top automobile firms in America, along with General Motors and Ford. (though the phrase "the Big Three" was not used at the time). Maxwell was the only profitable company of the combine named United States Motor Company, which was formed in 1910. Due to a conflict between two of its backers, the United States Motor Company collapsed in 1913 after the failure of its last supporting car manufacturer, the Brush Motor Company. Maxwell was the only survivor.

Maxwell Motor Company, Inc.
In 1913, the Maxwell assets were overseen by Walter Flanders, who reorganized the company as the "Maxwell Motor Company, Inc." The company moved to Highland Park, Michigan. Some of the Maxwells were also manufactured at two plants in Dayton, Ohio. By 1914, Maxwell had sold 60,000 cars.

The company responded to the increasing number of low-priced cars—including the $600 Ford Model N, the high-volume Oldsmobile Runabout at $650, the $485 Brush Runabout, the Black at $375, the $500 Western Gale Model A, and the bargain-basement Success an amazingly low $250—by introducing the Model 25, their cheapest four yet. At $695, this five-seat touring car had high-tension magneto ignition, electric horn and (optional) electric starter and headlights, and an innovative shock absorber to protect the radiator.

Takeover by Walter Chrysler

Maxwell eventually over-extended and wound up deeply in debt, with over half of its production unsold in the post-World War I recession in 1920. The following year, Walter P. Chrysler arranged to take a controlling interest in Maxwell Motors, subsequently re-incorporating it in West Virginia with himself as the chairman. One of his first tasks was to correct the faults in the Maxwell, whose quality had faltered. This improved version of the car was marketed as the "good Maxwell"

Around the time of Chrysler's takeover, Maxwell was also in the process of merging, awkwardly at best, with the ailing Chalmers Automobile Company. Chalmers ceased production in late 1923.

Phase out
In 1925, Chrysler formed his own company, the Chrysler Corporation. That same year, the Maxwell line was phased out and the Maxwell company assets were absorbed by Chrysler. The Maxwell automobile would continue to live on in another form however, because the new 4-cylinder Chrysler model that was introduced for the 1926 model year was created largely from the design of the previous year's Maxwell. And this former Maxwell would undergo another transformation in 1928, when a second reworking and renaming would bring about the creation of the first Plymouth.

Marketing to women 

Maxwell was one of the first car companies to market specifically to women. In 1909, it generated a great deal of publicity when it sponsored Alice Huyler Ramsey, an early advocate of women drivers, as the first woman to drive coast-to-coast across the United States. By 1914, the company had strongly aligned itself with the women's rights movement. That year, it announced its plan to hire as many male sales personnel as female. At that time, it offered a promotional reception at its Manhattan dealership which featured several prominent suffragettes such as Crystal Eastman, while in a showroom window a woman assembled and disassembled a Maxwell engine in front of onlookers.

In media 

In 1920, the Maxwell Company contracted with actress and producer Nell Shipman to create a short promotional film featuring the Maxwell. She was able to stretch the money budgeted for the project into a multi-reel feature entitled Something New. The Maxwell's abilities were prominently featured in this melodramatic film, which had Nell Shipman and Bert Van Tuyle escaping a band of Mexican bandits by racing the sturdy little car across the Mexican badlands where they overcame obstacles such as boulders, rivers, gulches, and all other sorts of rough terrain. Maxwell dealers presented this motion picture at various venues to promote the car, often with the now-battered Maxwell on display. The Maxwell Company had assisted in the film's production by supplying a car and by deploying a mechanic to the filming location. The mechanic's job included repeatedly replacing the car's transmission, which kept getting torn up by the harsh desert landscape.

A decrepit old Maxwell was famous as the car Jack Benny drove decades after it had stopped being manufactured. The running joke was that Benny was too stingy to buy himself a new car—or even a newer used car—as long as his old one still ran, however poorly. The sounds used for it were pre-recorded, but when a technical fault prevented one of the records from playing, voice actor Mel Blanc himself improvised the sounds of the sputtering car starting up. His performance was received well enough for him to continue that task permanently. The gag of the Maxwell as Benny car was used in the classic cartoon The Mouse That Jack Built. In one Jack Benny Show gag Rochester tells Benny that he reported to the Police that the Maxwell had been stolen although not for three hours; when Jack asks why Rochester delayed so long, Rochester explains it was because he stopped laughing. Many people erroneously assume that the antique automobile Jack Benny is seen driving during his cameo appearance in the 1962 comedy film It's a Mad, Mad, Mad, Mad World is a Maxwell; that car is, in fact, a 1931 Cadillac convertible coupe.

In the Twilight Zone episode "MR BEVIS" (Season 1 Episode 33) Bevis (Orson Bean) is talking to a police officer (William Schallert) about him buying his wrecked 1924 Rickenbacker. The officer responds facetiously that he has his eye on a 1927 Maxwell, which is two years after the Maxwell company closed.

See also
 Carl Breer
 List of defunct United States automobile manufacturers

References

Bibliography
 Clymer, Floyd. Treasury of Early American Automobiles, 1877–1925. New York: Bonanza Books, 1950.
 Darke, Paul. "Chrysler: The Baby of the Big Three", in Northey, Tom, ed. World of Automobiles, Vol. 4, pp. 364–9. London: Orbis, 1974.
 Kimes, Beverly Rae, and Clark, Henry Austin, Jr. Standard Catalog of American Cars, 1805–1942 (second edition). Krause Publications, Inc. 1989. .
 Kimes, Beverly Rae, and Clark, Henry Austin, Jr. Standard Catalog of American Cars, 1805–1942 (third edition). Krause Publications, Inc. 1996. .
 Yanik, Anthony J. Maxwell Motor and the Making of the Chrysler Corporation. Detroit: Wayne State University Press, 2009. .

External links
 Maxwell automobiles at ConceptCarz
 Maxwell: First Builder of Chrysler Cars at Allpar.com 
 Maxwell/Maxwell-Briscoe with photos of various Maxwells 
 Early Chrysler history (including Maxwell)
 Watch the 1920 movie "Something New" featuring the robust Maxwell-car in a 1-hr. extremely grueling albeit entertaining mountain-terrain ordeal  .

Chrysler
Defunct motor vehicle manufacturers of the United States
Motor vehicle manufacturers based in Michigan
Motor vehicle manufacturers based in New York (state)
1900s cars
1910s cars
1920s cars
Defunct manufacturing companies based in Michigan
Defunct manufacturing companies based in New York (state)
Defunct manufacturing companies based in Ohio
Vehicle manufacturing companies established in 1904
Vehicle manufacturing companies disestablished in 1925
History of Dayton, Ohio
Tarrytown, New York
1904 establishments in New York (state)
1925 disestablishments in Michigan
Veteran vehicles
Brass Era vehicles
Vintage vehicles
Cars introduced in 1904